Zhebrei is a rural locality (a village) in Frolovskoye Rural Settlement, Permsky District, Perm Krai, Russia. The population was 338 as of 2010. There are 48 streets.

Geography 
Zhebrei is located 36 km southeast of Perm (the district's administrative centre) by road. Nikulino is the nearest rural locality.

References 

Rural localities in Permsky District